The present chapel of the Palace of Versailles is the fifth in the history of the palace. These chapels evolved with the expansion of the château and formed the focal point of the daily life of the court during the Ancien Régime (Bluche, 1986, 1991; Petitfils, 1995; Solnon, 1987).

History of the chapels

First chapel 
The château's first chapel dated from the time of Louis XIII, and was located in a detached pavilion at the northeast of the château. Today, the pièce de la vaisselle d'or in the Petit appartement du roi occupies the approximate site of this first chapel.

It followed the two-story palatine model, which was traditional in France; successive chapels at Versailles also followed this model. This chapel was demolished in 1665 during construction of the Grotte de Thétys (Batifol, 1909, 1913; Kimball, 1944; Le Guillou, 1983, 1989; Marie, 1968; Verlet, 1985).

Second chapel 
The second chapel was constructed as part of Louis XIV's second building campaign (1669–1672), when Louis Le Vau constructed the Château Neuf. When the new part of the château was completed, the chapel was situated in the Grand appartement de la reine and formed the symmetrical pendant with the Salon de Diane in the Grand appartement du roi. This chapel was used by the royal family and court until 1678, when time a new chapel was built, and the structure converted into the Salle des Gardes de la Reine (Félibien, 1674; Kimball, 1944; Le Guillou, 1983, 1989; Marie, 1972, 1976; Scudéry, 1669; Verlet, 1985).

Third chapel 

Located next to the new Salle des Gardes de la Reine, this chapel served Versailles for a short period. Soon after its construction, Louis XIV found it inconvenient and impractical for his needs as well as those of his court, which he had officially installed at Versailles in 1682. That same year, this room was converted into the Grande Salles des Gardes de la Reine (and now exists as la Salle du Sacre) and a new chapel was built (Combes, 1681; Kimball, 1944; Le Guillou, 1983, 1989; Marie, 1972, 1976; Verlet, 1985).

Fourth chapel 
With the construction of the Aile du Nord, the north wing of the château, a new chapel was built. This project necessitated the destruction of the Grotte de Thétys; it was on this site that the new chapel was built in 1682. When the fourth chapel was constructed, the Salon de l'Abondance, which had served as the entry to the Cabinet des Médailles in the Petit appartement du roi, was transformed into the Vestibule de la Chapelle — so named as it was from this upper level of the chapel that the king and select members of the royal family heard daily Mass. This chapel remained in use until 1710, and was witness to many of the important events of the court and royal family during the reign of Louis XIV. Today, the Salon d'Hercule and the lower vestibule occupy the space of this site (Félibien, 1703; Kimball, 1944; Le Guillou, 1983, 1989; Marie, 1972, 1976; Piganiole de la Force, 1701; Verlet, 1985).

Fifth chapel 

As the focal point of Louis XIV's fourth (and last) building campaign (1699–1710), the fifth and final chapel of the château of Versailles is an unreserved masterpiece. Begun in 1689, construction was halted due to the War of the League of Augsburg; Jules Hardouin-Mansart resumed construction in 1699. Hardouin-Mansart continued working on the project until his death in 1708, at which time his brother-in-law, Robert de Cotte, finished the project (Blondel, 1752–1756; Marie, 1972, 1976; Nolhac, 1912–1913; Verlet, 1985; Walton, 1993). It was to become the largest of the royal chapels at Versailles, and the height of its vaulting alone was allowed to disturb the rather severe horizontality everywhere else apparent in the palace's roofline, leading to the design being disparaged by some contemporaries; the duc de Saint-Simon characterized it as an "enormous catafalque". Nevertheless, the magnificent interior has been widely admired to the present day and served as inspiration for Luigi Vanvitelli when he designed the chapel for the Palace of Caserta (Defilippis, 1968).

Dedicated to Saint Louis, patron saint of the Bourbons, the chapel was consecrated in 1710. The palatine model is of course traditional; however, the Corinthian colonnade of the tribune level is of a classic style that anticipates the neo-classicism that evolved during the 18th century, although its use here bespeaks a remarkable virtuosity. The tribune level is accessed by a vestibule, known as the Salon de la Chapelle, that was built at the same time as the chapel. The Salon de la Chapelle is decorated with white stone and the bas-relief sculpture, Louis XIV Crossing the Rhine by Nicolas and Guillaume Coustou forms the focal point of the rooms décor (Nolhac, 1912–1913; Verlet, 1985; Walton, 1993).

The floor of the chapel itself is inlaid with polychromatic marble, and at the steps at the foot of the altar is the crowned monogram of an interlaced double "L", alluding to Saint Louis and Louis XIV (Nolhac, 1912–1913; Verlet, 1985; Walton, 1993). The sculptural and painted decoration shows both Old Testament and New Testament themes (Lighthart, 1997; Nolhac, 1912–1913; Sabatier, 1999; Verlet, 1985; Walton, 1993). The ceiling of the nave represents God the Father in His Glory Bringing to the World the Promise of Redemption and was painted by Antoine Coypel; the exedra of the apse is decorated with Charles de la Fosse's The Resurrection of Christ; and, above the royal tribune is Jean Jouvenet's The Descent of the Holy Ghost upon the Virgin and the Apostles (Nolhac, 1912–1913; Walton, 1993).

During the 18th century, the chapel witnessed many court events. Te Deums were sung to celebrate military victories and the births of children (Fils de France and fille de France) to the king and queen; marriages were also celebrated in this chapel, such as the wedding of Louis XV's son the dauphin Louis with the Infanta Marie-Thérèse d'Espagne of Spain on 23 February 1745 and the wedding on 16 May 1770 of the dauphin – later Louis XVI of France – with Marie-Antoinette. However, of all the ceremonies held in the chapel, those associated the Order of the Holy Spirit were among the most elaborate. (Blondel, 1752–1756; Bluche, 2000; Boughton, 1986; Campan, 1823; Croÿ-Solre, 1906–1921; Hézuques, 1873; Luynes, 1860–1865; Nolhac, 1912–1913).

The chapel was de-consecrated in the 19th century and has since served as a venue for state and private events. Musical concerts are often held in this present chapel of Versailles.

Organ 

The organ of the fifth chapel of Versailles was built by Robert Clicquot and Julien Tribuot in 1709–1710. His first official presentation took place on Pentecost, Juin 8, 1710; the organist was Jean-Baptiste Buterne.

Marriages 
 July 24, 1685: Louis, Duke of Bourbon and Louise Françoise de BourbonCelebrated by the Bishop of Orléans
 February 18, 1692: Philippe, Duke of Chartres and Françoise Marie de BourbonCelebrated by the Cardinal de Bouillon
 May 19, 1692: Louis Auguste, Duke of Maine and Louise Bénédicte de BourbonCelebrated by the Cardinal de Bouillon
 January 19, 1732: Louis François, Prince of Conti and Louise Diane d'OrléansCelebrated by the Prince-Bishop of Strasbourg
 December 17, 1743: Louis Philippe, Duke of Chartres and Louise Henriette de BourbonCelebrated by the Archbishop of Paris
 December 29, 1744: Louis Jean Marie, Duke of Penthièvre and Maria Teresa Felicitas d'EsteCelebrated by the Archbishop of Paris
 February 23, 1745: Louis, Dauphin of France and Maria Teresa Rafaela of SpainCelebrated by the Prince-Bishop of Strasbourg
 May 3, 1753: Louis Joseph, Prince of Condé and Charlotte de RohanCelebrated by the Archbishop of Paris
 April 5, 1769: Louis Philippe, Duke of Chartres and Louise Marie Adélaïde de BourbonCelebrated by the Archbishop of Paris
 April 24, 1770: Louis Henri, Duke of Enghien and Bathilde d'OrléansCelebrated by the Archbishop of Paris
 May 16, 1770: Louis Auguste, Dauphin of France and Marie Antoinette of AustriaCelebrated by the Archbishop of Reims
 May 14, 1771: Louis Stanislas Xavier de France and Marie Joséphine of SavoyCelebrated by the Archbishop of Paris
 November 16, 1773: Charles Philippe of France and Maria Theresa of SavoyCelebrated by the Archbishop of Paris

Discography 
 the Du Roy-Soleil à la Révolution, l'orgue de la Chapelle royale de Versailles / From the Sun King to the Revolution, the organ of the Royal Chapel of Versailles. Marina Tchebourkina at the Great Organ of the Royal Chapel of the Palace of Versailles. — 2004. (EAN 13 : 3760075340032)
 Louis Claude Daquin, l'œuvre intégrale pour orgue / Louis Claude Daquin, Complete organ works. Marina Tchebourkina at the Great Organ of the Royal Chapel of the Palace of Versailles. — 2004. (EAN 13 : 3760075340049)
 Louis Marchand, l'œuvre intégrale pour orgue / Louis Marchand, Complete organ works. Marina Tchebourkina at the Great Organ of the Royal Chapel of the Palace of Versailles. 2-CD set. — 2005. (EAN 13 : 3760075340056)
 François Couperin, l'œuvre intégrale pour orgue / François Couperin, Complete organ works. Marina Tchebourkina at the Great Organ of the Royal Chapel at the Palace of Versailles. 2-CD set. — 2005. (EAN 13 : 3760075340063)

Bibliography 
 M. Tchebourkina. L'Orgue de la Chapelle royale de Versailles, Trois siècles d'histoire (The Organ of the Royal Chapel of Versailles, Three centuries of history). — Paris : Natives, 2010. — 256 p..
 Чебуркина М. Н. Французское органное искусство Барокко: Музыка, Органостроение, Исполнительство (French Baroque Organ Art: Musique, Organ building, Performance). — Paris : Natives, 2013. — 848 с..
 M. Tchebourkina. The Organ of the Royal Chapel: from the Sun King to… well after the Revolution // Livret CD – Du Roy-Soleil à la Révolution, l'orgue de la Chapelle royale de Versailles. — Paris : Natives / CDNAT03, 2004. — P. 39–48. (EAN 13 : 3760075340032).
 M. Tchebourkina. Nouveaux regards sur Le Marché ancien : Ce qui fut fait, fut-il fourni ? (The new views on The Ancient Deal: What was done, was it provided?) // Livret CD – Du Roy-Soleil à la Révolution, l'orgue de la Chapelle royale de Versailles. — Paris : Natives / CDNAT03, 2004. — P. 51–54 (EAN 13 : 3760075340032).
 M. Tchebourkina. Nouveaux regards sur Le Marché ancien : Le jeu des nouveaux jeux (The new views on The Ancient Deal: Play of new Stops) // Livret CD – Louis Claude Daquin, l'œuvre intégrale pour orgue. — Paris : Natives / CDNAT04, 2004. — P. 47–50 (EAN 13 : 3760075340049).
 M. Tchebourkina. L'orgue de la Chapelle royale de Versailles : À la recherche d'une composition perdue (The Organ of the Royal Chapel of Versailles: In search of a lost Organ Disposition) // L'Orgue. — Lyon, 2007. 2007–IV No. 280. — P. 3–112.
 M. Tchebourkina. Tricentenaire de l'orgue de la Chapelle royale de Versailles (1710–2010) : De la première mise en service de l'orgue (Tricentary of the Organ of the Royal Chapel of Versailles (1710–2010): About the first official putting into service of the organ ) // L'Orgue. — Lyon, 2009. 2009–III–IV No. 287–288. — P. 258–260.
 M. Tchebourkina. L'orgue de la Chapelle royale de Versailles (1710–2010) : Les progrès de la connaissance ou l'art difficile de l'humilité (The Organ of the Royal Chapel of Versailles (1710–2010): Advances in knowledges, or Difficult art of humility) // L'Orgue. — Lyon, 2010. 2010–III No. 291. — P. 35–69.
 M. Tchebourkina. Tricentenaire de l'orgue de la Chapelle royale de Versailles (1710–2010) (Tricentary of the Organ of the Royal Chapel of Versailles (1710–2010)) // Versalia. — Versailles, 2011. No. 14. — P. 143–175.

Notes

Sources 

Books

Journals

Palace of Versailles
World Heritage Sites in France
Religious buildings and structures completed in 1710
18th-century Roman Catholic church buildings in France
Versailles
Roman Catholic churches in Versailles
Roman Catholic chapels in France